Annamalai, or variants, may refer to:

Film and television
Annaamalai, a 1992 Tamil-language film
Annamalai (2002 TV series), a Tamil-language TV soap opera
Annamalai (2014 TV series), a Tamil-language TV historical soap opera
Annamalai (season 3), 2015

Places
Annamalai Hills, or Arunachala, in Tamil Nadu, India
Annamalaiyar Temple
Annamalai University, in  Chidambaram, Tamil Nadu, India

People
 K. Annamalai (fl. 2001), Indian politician
 M. Annamalai (politician) (fl. from 1979), Indian politician
 M. Annamalai (scientist) (born 1945), Indian space scientist
 S. Annamalai (fl. 1991), Indian politician

See also

Anaimalai Hills, or Elephant Mountains, a range of mountains in Kerala, India